The following are the dams and reservoirs located in Andaman and Nicobar Islands:

References

Andaman
Andaman and Nicobar Islands
Andaman and Nicobar Islands